Mark Gjonaj (born December 1968) is an American politician who served in the New York City Council from the 13th district from 2018 to 2021. He previously represented the 80th district of the New York State Assembly from 2013 to 2017. His district encompasses Morris Park, Pelham Parkway, Pelham Gardens, and Norwood, among other communities of the Bronx.

Early life and education
Gjonaj was born in the Bronx to an Albanian family from Reč, Montenegro. He attended St. Raymond High School for Boys and graduated from St. John's University with a Bachelor of Arts degree.

Career
Gjonaj is the president of M P Realty Group Corp., a real estate brokerage firm that he founded in 1999. His political experience prior to election was as a member of the New York City Taxi and Limousine Commission.

New York State Assembly
Gjonaj defeated incumbent assemblywoman Naomi Rivera in the 2012 Democratic primary race. On November 6, 2012, he won the general election with 79% of the vote.

New York City Council
In 2017, Gjonaj entered the race to represent the 13th District of the New York City Council, to replace Councilman James Vacca, who had to step down due to term limits. Gjonaj won the five-way primary with 39% of the vote.

On November 8, 2017, Gjonaj won his bid to replace New York City Councilman James Vacca, defeating the Republican candidate John Cerini by a margin of 49% to 36%.

In 2020, in response to the coronavirus pandemic and the ensuing recession, Gjonaj introduced a bill to cap fees charged by delivery applications (e.g. Grubhub).

Controversies 
In 2017, Gjonaj confirmed that he had used over $17,000 of donor funds to sue New York City for siting homeless shelters and mental health facilities in the Bronx.

In August 2018, Gjonaj was filmed chanting "shame" at Alessandra Biaggi, who was running in a primary against incumbent State Senator Jeffrey D. Klein. Gjonaj's chief of staff said that he was angry at Biaggi's support for bike infrastructure. Biaggi won the primary.

Election history

References

1968 births
Living people
Democratic Party members of the New York State Assembly
New York City Council members
American people of Albanian descent
21st-century American politicians
St. John's University (New York City) alumni
American people of Montenegrin descent
Politicians from the Bronx